Qushqovan may refer to:
 Qushqovan-e Olya
 Qushqovan-e Sofla